Vladimír Darida (born 8 August 1990) is a Czech professional footballer who plays as a central midfielder for Super League Greece club Aris Thessaloniki. He formerly represented the  Czech Republic national team.

Club career
Born in Plzeň, Darida came through at Viktoria Plzeň, also spending time on loan at FK Baník Sokolov in 2011. He joined Freiburg in 2013.

On 2 November 2014, he scored a penalty for the only goal of the game away to 1. FC Köln to give the club their first win in their 10th game of the season, moving them out of the direct relegation places.

Hertha BSC
Darida signed for Hertha from relegated Freiburg ahead of the 2015–16 season for an undisclosed fee. He was handed the number 6 shirt. He made an immediate impact for Hertha scoring on his debut in the DFB-Pokal first-round game against Arminia Bielefeld in a 2–0 win. He got his first assist of the season through setting up Salomon Kalou in a 3–1 defeat to Borussia Dortmund. On 27 September he got his first league goal of the season scoring the equaliser in a 1–1 draw away to Frankfurt.

Aris Thessaloniki
In December 2022 Darida signed for Aris Thessaloniki.

International career
On 28 May 2012, it was announced that Darida would be included in the Czech squad for the Euro 2012 tournament. He replaced injured defender Daniel Pudil. In the quarter-final match against Portugal (Euro 2012), he earned his second cap, his first in an official tournament, starting in place of the injured Tomáš Rosický. He was substituted after 61 minutes for Jan Rezek and the Czech Republic lost 1–0.

Career statistics

Club

International
Scores and results list Czech Republic's goal tally first, score column indicates score after each Darida goal.

Honours
Viktoria Plzeň
 Czech First League: 2010–11, 2012–13
 Czech Cup: 2009–10
 Czech Supercup: 2011

Czech Republic
 China Cup bronze: 2018

Individual
 Czech Footballer of the Year: 2017

References

External links
 
 
 

1990 births
Living people
Sportspeople from Plzeň
Czech footballers
Association football midfielders
Czech Republic international footballers
Czech Republic under-21 international footballers
Czech Republic youth international footballers
Czech First League players
Czech National Football League players
Bundesliga players
Super League Greece players
FC Viktoria Plzeň players
FK Baník Sokolov players
SC Freiburg players
Hertha BSC players
Aris Thessaloniki F.C. players
UEFA Euro 2012 players
UEFA Euro 2016 players
UEFA Euro 2020 players
Czech expatriate footballers
Czech expatriate sportspeople in Germany
Expatriate footballers in Germany
Czech expatriate sportspeople in Greece
Expatriate footballers in Greece